The Shao's moray (Gymnothorax shaoi) is an eel in the family Muraenidae (moray eels). It is a marine, temperate-water eel known from Taiwan, in the northwest Pacific Ocean. Males are known to reach a maximum total length of 60.8 cm.

The species epithet and common name were provided by the authors in honour of Kwang-Tsao Shao, whom they credited for supportive contributions both to the fish database in Taiwan and to their own eel-related studies.

References

Muraenidae
Taxa named by Chen Hong-Ming
Taxa named by Loh Kar-Hoe
Fish described in 2007